An M-ary transmission is a type of digital modulation where instead of transmitting one bit at a time, two or more bits are transmitted simultaneously.  This type of transmission results in reduced channel bandwidth. However, sometimes, two or more quadrature carriers are used for modulation. This process is known as quadrature modulation.

References 

An M-ary Transmission Scheme for Chaotic Communications, Kai Y. Cheong,  Francis C. M. Lau and Chi K. Tse.

Quantized radio modulation modes
Data transmission